Terence Murray Lewis, GM (born 29 February 1928) is a former Commissioner of the Queensland Police Service who was convicted and jailed for corruption and forgery as a result of the Fitzgerald Inquiry. He was stripped of his knighthood and two other awards in consequence.

Lewis has continued to protest his innocence, and sued his former lawyers and pursued appeals. The last of his appeals failed in August 2005.

Policing career

Early career
Lewis was inducted as a police officer in 1949. As a senior constable, Lewis was in charge of the Juvenile Aid Bureau. He was implicated in the National Hotel scandal. Lewis was also a close associate of the corrupt former Police Commissioner Frank Bischof and was allegedly one of his bagmen. Informant Shirley Brifman said: "the collect boys were Lewis, Murphy and Hallahan. That went to Bischof ".

Exile
In late 1975 then Inspector Lewis was transferred to Charleville, at the same time Tony Murphy was posted to Longreach. However, with Queensland Premier Joh Bjelke-Petersen unhappy with Commissioner Whitrod, he made two trips to Charleville in March and May 1976 to talk with Lewis, who had been mentioned to him as a possible future commissioner. Two opportunities came to overthrow Commissioner Whitrod: the Premier shifting Police Minister Max Hodges into another portfolio, who was replaced by Tom Newbery; and the retirement on 15 September of Assistant Commissioner Norm Gulbransen. On 15 November 1976, the State Cabinet had rejected Whitrod's proposed candidates to replace Assistant Commissioner Gulbransen and instead selected Lewis, who had beaten 122 equal or more senior officers for the role.

Police Commissioner
Former Royal Commissioner Donald Stewart observed that in 1976, Lewis "was plucked from well-deserved obscurity by Premier Bjelke-Petersen to be his vassal, to do his bidding, lawful or otherwise". Initially, Lewis was promoted to the rank of Assistant Police Commissioner to Ray Whitrod, however, Whitrod refused to work with him and resigned in protest when Bjelke-Petersen insisted on Lewis's appointment.

Downfall
Lewis served as Police Commissioner from 1976 to 1987, receiving a knighthood, but was stood down by police minister Bill Gunn on 21 September 1987, before being dismissed on 19 April 1989. By 1980, Detective Jack Herbert had become Lewis's bagman, but he later became a major informant against Lewis and others at the Fitzgerald Inquiry. Assistant Commissioner Graeme Parker also confessed to corruption and implicated Lewis on 16 September 1987.

Trial
Following the end of the Fitzgerald Inquiry, Lewis was charged in 1989 with 23 counts of perjury, corruption, and forgery. After hearing evidence over five months, and having deliberated for five days, a District Court jury found that, although Lewis had not lied to the inquiry, he had accepted bribes totalling $700,000 to protect brothels, SP (starting price) bookmakers, illegal casinos and in-line machine operators, and to prevent poker machines being legally introduced in Queensland. He was also found to have forged Bjelke-Petersen's signature on an official police document in 1981.

Prison
Judge Healy sentenced Lewis to the maximum prison term possible – 14 years on the 15 corruption charges and 10 years on the forgery charge – to be served concurrently, fixed a non-parole period of 9½ years, and fined Lewis $50,000 on each of the corruption charges. Lewis was paroled in 2002 after serving 10½ years. He has continued to protest his innocence, suing his former lawyers and pursuing further appeals. The last of his appeals failed in August 2005.

Awards and honours
Lewis received the following honours:

Churchill Fellowship in 1968 for his work with the Juvenile Aid Bureau.

In March 1993 the Queen stripped Lewis of the awards of Knight Bachelor, Officer of the Order of the British Empire and Queen's Police Medal for Merit. Lewis became only the 14th person since the 14th century to be stripped of his knighthood. He retained the George Medal, which was awarded for gallantry; and the National Medal awarded for service.

See also
 Domenico Cacciola
 Francis Bischof
 Leisha Harvey
 Don Lane (politician)
 Brian Austin

References

Further reading

Bishop, Steve (2012). The Most Dangerous Detective: the Outrageous Glen Patrick Hallahan and the Rat Pack, Amazon.com. 
Condon, Matthew (2013) Three Crooked Kings, University of Queensland Press

External links
Two books about crime and corruption in the Queensland police – Gold Coast Writers Association, 2014. 
"Resignation at root of later inquiry", News Limited, 1 January 2007
"The State of Play in Acquisition of Property: Theophanous v The Commonwealth" PDF, Sean Brennan, 16 February 2007
, The Courier Mail 2 March 2013 "Last Man Standing: Condemned former state police commissioner Terence Lewis decides it's time to tell his side of the story", Matthew Condon

1928 births
Living people
Australian police officers convicted of crimes
Police officers convicted of accepting bribes
People stripped of a British Commonwealth honour
Recipients of the George Medal
Commissioners of the Queensland Police
People convicted of forgery